Gisèle Biémouret (born 16 June 1952) is a French politician who was member of the National Assembly of France for Gers's 2nd constituency from 2007 to 2022. She is a member of the SRC parliamentary group.

She didn't stand for re-election in the 2022 French legislative election.

References

External links
 Gisèle Biémouret blog

1952 births
Living people
People from Gers
21st-century French women politicians
Women members of the National Assembly (France)
Deputies of the 13th National Assembly of the French Fifth Republic
Deputies of the 14th National Assembly of the French Fifth Republic
Deputies of the 15th National Assembly of the French Fifth Republic

Socialist Party (France) politicians